Reader Rabbit: 1st Grade (known as Reader Rabbit Key Stage 1: Year 1 in the United Kingdom) is an educational video game, part of the Reader Rabbit series, developed by KnowWare and published by The Learning Company on January 14, 1998. The game was re-released on the Nintendo Wii by Graffiti Entertainment on May 4, 2010.

Plot
The Old Theatre has everything ready for a performance. However the porcupine Spike feels dissatisfied about not being the star of the show, so he takes and hides the musical instruments, costumes, scripts, props and other necessities so the performance cannot start. Reader Rabbit and his friends have only a number of hours to make preparations before tonight's performance.

Gameplay
The players encounter interesting characters and take part in educational activities through the game's point-and-click interface, with a goal being to get everything ready for the show. The game focuses on vocabulary, phonics, addition and subtraction.

Commercial performance
The game was the second top-selling home education title across nine software retail chains (representing more than 40 percent of the U.S. market) in the week that ended on April 4, 1998. It was also the seventh top-selling educational titles across 13 software chains (representing 57 percent of the U.S. market), for the week ending on March 20, 1999.

Critical reception

Common Sense Media said the game has a "nice mix of animation, song, and solid educational gaming", and declared it the "top first-grade title". Superkids deemed it "lightweight", "lively", and "entertaining". Tech With Kids thought the activities were "supportive, funny, and always upbeat", and described the learning activities as "fabulous". Edutaining Kids wrote the game was highly entertaining and positively compared it to Reader Rabbit Reading Learning System. Discovery School praised the game for its "exciting adventure storyline", "gorgeous cartoon world to explore", and "outstanding learning activities". The Washington Post said "this title makes the grade", unlike other Reader Rabbit titles. Reading Tutor said the game was a prime example of how Reader Rabbit puts educational games in the context of an interesting story line. Jeffrey Kessler who worked as a Learning Specialist for the Reader Rabbit franchise described the game as a clever mix of math, reading, art and emotion rather than a year's curriculum.

In their review of the 2010 Nintendo Wii port of the game, USA Today thought the game wasn't perfect, as the controls do not make good use of the Wii's capabilities.

References

External links
 

Children's educational video games
The Learning Company games
1998 video games
Reader Rabbit
Video games developed in the United States
Windows games
Classic Mac OS games
Wii games
Single-player video games
Graffiti Entertainment games